Jhajhoo is a large rural village located in Kolayat Tehsil of Bikaner of Rajasthan state, India.

 from Jodhpur, and
 from Mount Abu.

In accordance with the Panchyati Raaj Act the village is administrated by a sarpanch (head of the village), who is elected every five years. In 2011 the population in the village was 7574, comprising 1229 households.

References

Villages in Bikaner district